Léo Gandelman (born Leonardo Gandelman; August 10, 1956, in Rio de Janeiro) is a Brazilian saxophonist, composer and producer. He has played with Lulu Santos, and guest appeared in Titãs' single "Televisão". He is also known for composing soundtracks for Brazilian telenovelas, films and TV series.

Although he spent his childhood studying classical music, he ended up furthering studies on saxophone, composition and arrangements at Berklee College of Music. Gandelman has a son who is also a musician, Miguel Gandelman.

References 

1956 births
Living people
Brazilian saxophonists
Male saxophonists
Brazilian composers
Brazilian record producers
Berklee College of Music alumni
Brazilian Jews
Jewish musicians
Musicians from Rio de Janeiro (city)
21st-century saxophonists
21st-century male musicians